Londerzeel is a municipality located in the Belgian province of Flemish Brabant. The municipality comprises the towns of Londerzeel proper, Malderen, Steenhuffel (home of Palm Breweries) and Sint-Jozef. On 1 January 2006, Londerzeel had a total population of 17,435. The total area is 36.29 km2 which gives a population density of 480 inhabitants per km2.

Their football team is K. Londerzeel S.K.

Notable people
 Gerard Walschap (b. Londerzeel-St. Jozef, 9 July 1898-Antwerp, 25 October 1989), writer.
 Kris Van Assche, fashion designer.

Twin towns 
Londerzeel has been twinned with Gladenbach (Germany) since 2010.

References

External links

 
Palm- Available only in Dutch and French

Municipalities of Flemish Brabant